Leptotyphlops distanti, also known commonly as Distant's thread snake or Distant's worm snake, is a species of snake in the family Leptotyphlopidae. The species is native to Southern Africa.

Etymology
The specific name, distanti, is in honor of English entomologist William Lucas Distant.

Geographic range
L. distanti is found in Eswatini, southern Mozambique, and South Africa.

Habitat

Description
Dorsally, L. distanti is gray-black. Ventrally, it is paler.

Reproduction
L. distanti is oviparous.

Gallery

References

Further reading
Boulenger GA (1892). "Reptilia and Batrachia". pp. 174–176. In: Distant WL (1892). A Naturalist in the Transvaal. London: R.H. Porter. (Taylor and Francis, printers). xvi + 277 pp. + Plates I-III. (Glauconia distanti, new species, pp. 175–176, three line drawings).
Boulenger GA (1893). Catalogue of the Snakes in the British Museum (Natural History). Volume I., Containing the Families Typhlopidæ, Glauconiidæ ... London: Trustees of the British Museum (Natural History). (Taylor and Francis, printers). xiii + 448 pp. + Plates I-XXVIII. (Glauconia distanti, p. 62).

External Links
 iNaturalist page

Leptotyphlops
Reptiles described in 1892